Louis Frederick Angotti (January 16, 1938 – September 15, 2021) was a Canadian professional ice hockey player and coach who played ten seasons in the National Hockey League (NHL).  He played for the New York Rangers, Chicago Black Hawks, Philadelphia Flyers, Pittsburgh Penguins, and St. Louis Blues from 1964 to 1974.

Early life
Angotti was born in Toronto on January 16, 1938.  He played his junior hockey for the Toronto St. Michael's Majors.  He then enrolled in Michigan Tech University where he earned an engineering degree while skating for powerful college clubs.  He appeared in two NCAA championship games, losing the 1960 game while winning in 1962.  He was MVP of both tournaments and was All-WCHA First Team for 1961–62.

Professional career
Angotti signed with the New York Rangers of the National Hockey League (NHL), playing two seasons with the minor league Rochester Americans before being called up to the big league club in 1964-65.  Angotti quickly became known for his high-energy, speedy play.  Over the next nine seasons, he played with the Chicago Black Hawks, Philadelphia Flyers, Pittsburgh Penguins, and St. Louis Blues.  He had his best offensive season in 1967–68 with the Flyers, when he scored 49 points while serving as the club's first captain.  During his second stint with Chicago (from 1969 through 1973), he served as a key defensive component on a team that narrowly lost two Stanley Cup Final series.

During his final season with the Blues in 1973–74, Angotti was hired as coach after Jean-Guy Talbot was fired with 23 games remaining in the season.  He retired to serve as head coach on a full-time basis, but was fired just nine games into the next year.  He returned to play hockey with the Chicago Cougars of the World Hockey Association (WHA). Angotti again served as head coach during the 1983-84 season, this time with the Pittsburgh Penguins.

Angotti also coached the New Brunswick Hawks, Erie Blades, and Baltimore Skipjacks of the American Hockey League (AHL) for one season each.

Later life
Following his playing career, Angotti was a color commentator for Chicago Blackhawks games on WSNS-TV and WCFL radio.  He was first inducted into the Michigan Tech Sports Hall of Fame in 1991 as an individual player.  He was enshrined again in 2012 together with the 1962 team on the 50th anniversary of the school's first NCAA title. He periodically participated in community activities by the Chicago Blackhawk Alumni Association.

Angotti died on September 15, 2021, at Holy Cross Hospital in Fort Lauderdale, Florida.  He was 83 years old.

Career statistics
Sources:

Coaching record
Source:

Awards and honors

References

External links

1938 births
2021 deaths
AHCA Division I men's ice hockey All-Americans
Baltimore Skipjacks coaches
Canadian ice hockey coaches
Canadian ice hockey right wingers
Chicago Blackhawks announcers
Chicago Blackhawks players
Chicago Cougars players
Detroit Red Wings players
Michigan Tech Huskies men's ice hockey players
National Hockey League broadcasters
NCAA men's ice hockey national champions
New Brunswick Hawks
New York Rangers players
Philadelphia Flyers captains
Philadelphia Flyers players
Pittsburgh Penguins coaches
Pittsburgh Penguins players
Pittsburgh Penguins scouts
St. Louis Blues coaches
St. Louis Blues players
Ice hockey people from Toronto
Toronto St. Michael's Majors players